M. G. Hashmat was a lyricist and script writer in Indian films. He worked mostly in Bollywood movies as songwriter. He has written 202 songs in 51 Hindi films.

Discography
Bachche Mere Saathi (1972)
Do Chattane (1974)
Jeevan Sangram (1974)
Kora Kagaz (1974)
Do Jhoot (1975)
Ranga Khush (1975)
Sanyasi (1975)
Uljhan (1975)
Fauji (1976)
Mera Jeevan (1976)
Sankoch (1976)
Tapasya (1976)
Yaari Zindabad (1976)
Aaj Ka Yeh Ghar (1977)
Duniyadaari (1977)
Pandit Aur Pathan (1977)
Veeru Ustad (1977)
Do Musafir (1978)
Trishna (1978)
Vishnawanath (1978)
Atmaram (1979)
Habari (1979)
Humkadam (1980)
Teen Eekay (1980)
Naari (1981)
Bheegi Palkein (1982)
Siskiyan (1982)
Haadsa (1983)
Bandhe Honth (1984)
Paapi Pet Ka Sawaal Hai (1984)
Ram Ki Ganga (1984)
Awara Baap (1985)
Paisa Yeh Paisa (1985)
Samay Ki Dhara (1986)
Swarthi (1986)
Insaaf Ki Jung (1988)
Naam Hai Krishna (1988)
Tadap Aisi Bhi Hoti Hai (1988)
Prem Jaal (1989)
Honeymoon (1992)
Phoolwati (1992)
Bhagyawaan (1993)
Pyaar Ka Taraana (1993)
Gangster (1994)
Hulchul (1995)
Kala Sach (1995)
The Gambler (1995)
Hind Ko Beti (1996)Jagannath (1996)Miss 420 (1998)Prem Aggan (1998)Hote Hote Pyaar Ho Gaya'' (1999)

Awards and nominations
Filmfare Award for Best Lyricist – 1974 for "Mera Jeevan Kora Kagaz" (nominated)
BFJA Awards for Best Lyricist - 1975 (won)

References

External links

Hindi screenwriters
Hindi-language lyricists
20th-century Indian composers
Living people
Year of birth missing (living people)